Lucette Moreau (born 17 January 1956) is a Canadian athlete. She competed in the women's shot put and the women's discus throw at the 1976 Summer Olympics.

References

External links
 

1956 births
Living people
People from Montérégie
French Quebecers
Athletes (track and field) at the 1976 Summer Olympics
Athletes (track and field) at the 1978 Commonwealth Games
Canadian female shot putters
Canadian female discus throwers
Olympic track and field athletes of Canada
Sportspeople from Quebec
Commonwealth Games medallists in athletics
Commonwealth Games bronze medallists for Canada
Athletes (track and field) at the 1975 Pan American Games
Pan American Games medalists in athletics (track and field)
Pan American Games bronze medalists for Canada
Medalists at the 1975 Pan American Games
20th-century Canadian women
21st-century Canadian women
Medallists at the 1978 Commonwealth Games